Whicham is a civil parish in the Borough of Copeland, Cumbria, England.  It contains eleven listed buildings that are recorded in the National Heritage List for England.  All the listed buildings are designated at Grade II, the lowest of the three grades, which is applied to "buildings of national importance and special interest".  The parish contains the villages or hamlets of Silecroft, Kirksanton, Whicham and Whitbeck and is otherwise rural.  The listed buildings comprise houses, farmhouses and farm buildings, two churches, a former brewery, a former mill, and a limekiln.


Buildings

Notes and references

Notes

Citations

Sources

 (Whitbeck church)
 (Whicham church)

Lists of listed buildings in Cumbria
Listed buildings